Harold "Hal" Ledyard (July 7, 1931 – April 21, 1973) was a professional gridiron football player in the National Football League and Canadian Football League.

After backing up future Pro Football Hall of Famer Y. A. Tittle in 1953, Ledyard joined the United States Army, where he played quarterback for the Fort Jackson base football team in 1955. Ledyard joined the Ottawa Rough Riders in 1956 and spent three seasons as the team's starting quarterback before being replaced by Frank Tripucka before the 1959 season. Ledyard signed with the Toronto Argonauts in 1959, but was waived before the season began.

After not being signed during the 1960 football season, Ledyard returned to the CFL in 1961 with the Winnipeg Blue Bombers, splitting playing time with Dick Thornton and future Canadian Football Hall of Famer Ken Ploen. During his time in Winnipeg, Ledyard was known as "The best relief pitcher in football" due to his success relieving Ploen. He was a part of the Blue Bomber teams that won the 49th and 50th Grey Cups.

Hal Ledyard is the father of retired professional hockey player Grant Ledyard.

Ledyard died April 21, 1973 in a drowning accident at Big Sur.

References

1931 births
1973 deaths
American football quarterbacks
Canadian football quarterbacks
American players of Canadian football
San Francisco 49ers players
Ottawa Rough Riders players
Winnipeg Blue Bombers players
Chattanooga Mocs football players
Players of American football from Montgomery, Alabama
People from Chattanooga, Tennessee
Sportspeople from Montgomery, Alabama
Accidental deaths in California
Deaths by drowning in California